Lazavik is a creature of Belarusian mythology.

Description 
Lazavik is a benevolent Belarusian mythological character that lives amid the vine bushes ("laza" in Belarusian language). In Belarusian folk tales Lazavik is described as a small creature with one eye, a long beard and a very long whip in his hand. Belarusian people used to say that when Lazavik walks through the marshland, his only eye shines like a light.

Mode of life

The creature Lazavik prefers to stay unnoticed by people, and constantly tries to hide in its house.
The house of Lazavik is small, with no windows and no doors.
In fact Lazavik is the guardian of Belarusian marshes. 
It is believed that Lazavik dies if its marshes are drained. With its whip, Lazavik drives away small, harmful, and noisy Lozniks through the vine bushes.

See also
 Damavik
 Dzedka
 Shatans
 Younik
 Zheuzhyk
 Zhytsen
 Zlydzens

References

Slavic legendary creatures
Slavic mythology
Belarusian folklore
Cyclopes